Sunshine is a 1975 American television comedy-drama series starring Cliff DeYoung and Elizabeth Cheshire, about a hippie musician raising his young daughter alone after the death of his wife. The series was based on the 1973 made-for-TV movie Sunshine and DeYoung, Bill Mumy, Corey Fischer, and Meg Foster all reprised their roles from the film. The series originally ran for 13 episodes on NBC in the spring of 1975. The show's opening theme was John Denver's hit song "Sunshine on My Shoulders."

Plot
Three years after the death of his wife Kate (which occurred at the end of the 1973 Sunshine film), musician Sam Hayden (Cliff DeYoung) is raising their young daughter Jill (Elizabeth Cheshire) as a single father. Sam struggles to make ends meet by playing in a folk rock trio with Weaver (Bill Mumy) and Givits (Corey Fischer) and by doing various day jobs. Although Sam's responsibilities leave little time for him to date women, he hopes to find one he can love who will also be a good mother to Jill. Meanwhile, Weaver, Givits, and Sam's occasional girlfriend Nora (Meg Foster) pitch in to help Sam care for Jill.

Cast 
Cliff DeYoung as Sam Hayden
Elizabeth Cheshire as Jill Hayden
Bill Mumy as Weaver
Corey Fischer as Givits
Meg Foster as Nora

Episodes

Reception
Although the series drew praise from critics for its quality and realism, its timeslot forced it to compete for young viewers with the popular CBS series The Waltons, and older viewers were not interested in watching a show about a hippie. A Chicago Tribune reviewer also blamed the series' failure on its portrayal of daughter Jill as an ill-mannered "pest". Sunshine performed poorly in the Nielsen ratings and was cancelled after 13 episodes.

After its cancellation, the series was described as being "before its time" and "one of the most interesting failures" of the season. Five episodes of Sunshine were later combined into a feature-length movie called My Sweet Lady which was widely circulated in England, Japan and Australia, resulting in the characters becoming better known in those countries than they were in the United States.

In 1977, NBC took the unusual step of reuniting the original cast of the cancelled series for a two-hour holiday television film, Sunshine Christmas, which the network first aired on December 12, 1977. In the movie, Sam and Jill return to his native Texas to visit Sam's parents, and Sam rekindles a romance with his high school sweetheart.

Book adaptation
In 1975, a novelization of the series by Norma Klein entitled The Sunshine Years was published. Klein had previously written the novelization of the Sunshine film, and later did the same for Sunshine Christmas.

References

External links

1975 American television series debuts
1975 American television series endings
1970s American comedy-drama television series
NBC original programming
Television series by Universal Television
Television shows set in Vancouver